Cyclophora diplosticta is a moth in the  family Geometridae. It is found in Cameroon and Gabon.

References

Moths described in 1918
Cyclophora (moth)
Insects of Cameroon
Fauna of Gabon
Moths of Africa